Bedřich Brunclík (born July 6, 1946) is a Czech former ice hockey player and coach.

Brunclík's first team was Slavia Prague (1956–65). He holds a HC Košice club record: after joining them initially as part of his national military service he played for the Slovak team for 16 seasons, scoring 237 in 583 games. He was also their head coach, and had additional appointments with teams in the Netherlands.

References

External links
 Official website of HC Košice

1946 births
Living people
Czech ice hockey forwards
Ice hockey people from Prague
Czechoslovak ice hockey forwards
Czech ice hockey coaches
Czechoslovak ice hockey coaches
HC Košice players
Czech expatriate ice hockey people
Czechoslovak expatriate sportspeople in the Netherlands
Czech expatriate sportspeople in Slovakia
Czechoslovakia (WHA) players